Matthias Sommer (born 3 December 1991) is a German bobsledder. He won a bronze medal at the 2022 Winter Olympics in the two-man bobsled.

References

External links
 
 
 
 
 Matthias Sommer at the Bob und Schlittenverband Deutschland 

Living people
1991 births
Bobsledders at the 2022 Winter Olympics
Olympic bobsledders of Germany
German male bobsledders
People from Witten
Sportspeople from Arnsberg (region)
Olympic bronze medalists for Germany
Medalists at the 2022 Winter Olympics
Olympic medalists in bobsleigh
21st-century German people